Dashnor Shehi was the minister for labour, emigration, and social support for Albania in the 1992 government of Sali Berisha. He is a member of the Democratic Party.

References

Living people
Year of birth missing (living people)
Democratic Party of Albania politicians
20th-century Albanian politicians
Place of birth missing (living people)
Labour ministers of Albania